Conclave is an upcoming thriller film directed by Edward Berger, based on the novel of the same name by Robert Harris.

Premise
Cardinal Lomeli, with the task of finding the successor of the deceased Pope, discovers the former Pope had a secret that must be uncovered.

Cast
 Ralph Fiennes as Cardinal Lomeli
 John Lithgow as Cardinal Tremblay
 Stanley Tucci as Cardinal Bellini
 Isabella Rossellini as Sister Agnes
 Sergio Castellitto
 Carlos Diehz
 Lucian Msamati
 Brían F. O'Byrne
 Thomas Loibl
 Merab Ninidze
 Jacek Koman

Production
It was announced in May 2022 that Ralph Fiennes, John Lithgow, Stanley Tucci and Isabella Rossellini were set to star in the film, with Edward Berger directing.

Additional casting was announced in January 2023 as production began in Rome. Filming will also occur at Cinecittà. It is due to conclude in March.

References

External links
Conclave at the Internet Movie Database

Upcoming films
British thriller films
Films set in Vatican City
Films shot in Rome
Films shot at Cinecittà Studios
FilmNation Entertainment films